Aymon of Ortinge, also known as Amanieu d'Ortigue or Amanieu de l'Artigue, was a French mercenary captain during the Hundred Years War. His story is mentioned in the Chronicles of Froissart

He was an adventurer of Gascony origins, perhaps from the hamlet of Ortigues in the commune of Cézac.

After the Treaty of Brétigny Hagre and his men found themselves unemployed and so they joined the 30 so-called Tard-Venus bandit groups, that ranged the French country side pillaging towns.

On May 11, 1369, Louis Duke of Anjou had Amanieu d'Ortigue, Noli Pavalhon and Guyonnet de Pau, beheaded and quartered, because they had conspired with the bandits Le Petit Meschin and Perrin de Savoie, to deliver the duke to the English.

References

1369 deaths
People of the Hundred Years' War
French soldiers
French mercenaries
Year of birth unknown
French prisoners of war in the Hundred Years' War
Hundred Years' War
Medieval mercenaries
14th century in France